Chicocenebra gubbi, common name : Gubb's murex,  is a species of sea snail, a marine gastropod mollusk in the family Muricidae, the murex snails or rock snails.

Description
The shell size varies between 24 mm and 60 mm

Distribution
This species is distributed in the Atlantic Ocean along Angola and Senegal.

References

External links
 

Ocenebrinae
Gastropods described in 1849